Gettin' Ready is the fourth studio album by The Temptations for the Gordy (Motown) label released in 1966. It marks the transition of the group from having Smokey Robinson as its main producer, with new producer Norman Whitfield taking over Robinson's position. Two #1 R&B hit singles, one from each producer, are included: "Get Ready" from Robinson with Eddie Kendricks on lead, and "Ain't Too Proud to Beg" from Whitfield with David Ruffin on lead. Also included is the original version of "Too Busy Thinking About My Baby," which would be rerecorded as a hit for Marvin Gaye in 1969. The album was also one of the last albums to contain tracks co-authored by members of the group until the release of The Temptations Do The Temptations (1976). As with previous Temptations albums, several songs are written by members of The Miracles: Smokey Robinson, Bobby Rogers, Pete Moore, Ronnie White, and Marv Tarplin.

Track listing

Side one
"Say You" (Charles Jones, Robert Dobyne, Robert Staunton) (lead singers: David Ruffin, Melvin Franklin)* 2:33
"Little Miss Sweetness" (Smokey Robinson) (lead singer: David Ruffin) 3:12
"Ain't Too Proud to Beg" (Edward Holland, Jr., Norman Whitfield) (lead singer: David Ruffin) 2:36
"Get Ready" (Robinson) (lead singer: Eddie Kendricks; adlibs: Melvin Franklin) 2:44
"Lonely, Lonely Man Am I" (Holland, Eddie Kendricks, Whitfield) (lead singers: Paul Williams, Melvin Franklin) 2:37
"Too Busy Thinking About My Baby" (Janie Bradford, Barrett Strong, Whitfield) (lead singer: Eddie Kendricks) 2:41

Side two
"I've Been Good to You" (Robinson) (lead singer: Eddie Kendricks, Melvin Franklin) 3:04
"It's a Lonely World Without Your Love" (Ivy Jo Hunter, William "Mickey" Stevenson) (lead singer: Eddie Kendricks) 2:36
"Fading Away" (Pete Moore, Robinson, Bobby Rogers) (lead singer: Eddie Kendricks) 2:41
"Who You Gonna Run To" (Robinson) (lead singer: Paul Williams) 3:12
"You're Not an Ordinary Girl" (Moore, Robinson, Rogers, Marv Tarplin, Ronnie White) (lead singer: Eddie Kendricks) 2:54
"Not Now (I'll Tell You Later)" (Robinson, Otis Williams)*** (lead singers: Eddie Kendricks, Melvin Franklin) 2:59

1998 CD reissue bonus tracks
"Give It Up" ** (Sylvester Potts, Mary Wells) (lead singer: Paul Williams) 2:21
"The Man Who Don't Believe In Love" ** (Marv Johnson) (lead singer: Paul Williams) 2:27

Notes
(*) in mono
(**) bonus tracks for compact disc re-release, unreleased tracks dating from the Elbridge Bryant era of the early 1960s.
(***) Recorded in 1963 during the Elbridge Bryant era with The Supremes as background vocals.

Personnel

The Temptations
 David Ruffin – vocals (side one, tracks 1–5 on side two)
 Eddie Kendricks – vocals
 Paul Williams – vocals
 Melvin Franklin – vocals
 Otis Williams – vocals
 Elbridge "Al" Bryant – vocals (track 6 on side two, CD version bonus tracks)
with:
 The Andantes – backing vocals ("Get Ready")
 The Supremes – backing vocals ("Not Now, I'll Tell You Later")
 The Funk Brothers – instrumentation
 Detroit Symphony Orchestra – instrumentation (some tracks)

Producers
 Smokey Robinson – "Little Miss Sweetness", "Get Ready", "I've Been Good to You", "Fading Away", "Who You Gonna Run Two", "You're Not an Ordinary Girl" and "Not Now, I'll Tell You Later", Executive Producer 
 Norman Whitfield – "Ain't Too Proud to Beg", "Lonely, Lonely Man Am I" and "Too Busy Thinking About My Baby", Executive Producer 
 Robert Staunton and Robert Walker, producers – "Say You"
 William "Mickey" Stevenson and Ivy Jo Hunter – "It's A Lonely World Without Your Love"
 Sylvester Potts (of The Contours)  – "Give It Up"
 Marv Johnson – "The Man Who Didn't Believe in Love"

Charts

Singles

Weekly charts

See also
List of number-one R&B albums of 1966 (U.S.)

References

1966 albums
The Temptations albums
Gordy Records albums
Albums produced by Norman Whitfield
Albums produced by Smokey Robinson
Albums produced by William "Mickey" Stevenson
Albums produced by Ivy Jo Hunter
Albums recorded at Hitsville U.S.A.